William Davis (1812–1873) was an Irish artist, and part of a group of Liverpool based artists who were influenced by the Pre-Raphaelite style of painting.

He was born in Dublin, received his artistic education there and begun his career as a portrait painter. He moved to Liverpool in 1842 and began to exhibit in the Liverpool Academy. In 1851, he started to exhibit at the Royal Academy of Arts in London. Originally painting still lives in 1853 he began producing landscapes. His work was admired by Dante Gabriel Rossetti and Ford Madox Brown, through which he was asked to join the Hogarth club.

See also
List of Pre-Raphaelite paintings - including the work of William Davis. 
William Lindsay Windus
Daniel Alexander Williamson
James Campbell
John Lee

References

External links

1812 births
1873 deaths
19th-century Irish painters
Irish male painters
Painters from Dublin (city)
Pre-Raphaelite painters
19th-century Irish male artists